Batmönkh is a Mongolian personal name.
Notable people bearing this name include:
As proper name
 Jambyn Batmönkh (1926–1997), Mongolian communist political leader and economics professor
As patronymic
 Batmönkhiin Erkhembayar, Mongolian international footballer
 Kyokutenzan Takeshi (born 1973 as Batmönkhiin Enkhbat), former professional sumo wrestler from Mongolia